"True Love Waits" is a song by the English rock band Radiohead. Radiohead worked on it for over two decades before releasing it on their ninth album, A Moon Shaped Pool (2016). 

Radiohead first performed "True Love Waits" in 1995, with the singer, Thom Yorke, on acoustic guitar accompanied by synthesiser. Yorke performed it solo on guitar or Rhodes piano several times in the following years, and it became one of Radiohead's best-known unreleased songs. A performance was released on I Might Be Wrong: Live Recordings (2001).

Radiohead and their producer Nigel Godrich attempted to record "True Love Waits" several times, experimenting with different styles, but could not settle on an arrangement. Some of these versions were released on the compilations MiniDiscs [Hacked] (2019) and Kid A Mnesia (2021).

In 2016, Radiohead released "True Love Waits" as the closing track on A Moon Shaped Pool, rearranged as a minimal piano ballad. It received positive reviews, and Pitchfork named it among the greatest songs of the decade. Several critics felt the long wait made the studio version more powerful. Though it was not released as a single, "True Love Waits" entered the French SNEP and US Billboard Hot Rock Songs singles charts.

History

1995—1996: First performances 
Radiohead first performed "True Love Waits" in December 1995 in Brussels while touring for their second album, The Bends. The songwriter, Thom Yorke, performed it on acoustic guitar accompanied by an "airy" keyboard melody. Over the years, the song became a fan favourite and one of Radiohead's best-known unreleased songs.

1996—1997: OK Computer 
Radiohead worked on "True Love Waits" for their third album, OK Computer (1997), but discarded it. Keyboard loops recorded for "True Love Waits" in this period were released on the 2017 reissue OKNOTOK 1997 2017. Other versions recorded in this period were leaked in the 2019 compilation MiniDiscs [Hacked], including a version featuring "spacey" synthesisers and a wah-wah effect.

1999—2001: Kid A and Amnesiac 
Radiohead worked on "True Love Waits" again during the sessions for their albums Kid A (2000) and Amnesiac (2001), which were recorded simultaneously. They hoped to find an arrangement beyond "just acoustic guitar". The guitarist Ed O'Brien kept an online diary of the band's progress, and wrote in January 2000:

One month later, he wrote:

During this period, Radiohead created an electronic version of "True Love Waits" using the keyboard loops recorded in the OK Computer sessions. Yorke said later: "We felt like 'True Love Waits' was this wholesome acoustic thing, and then suddenly putting this quite fierce thing... We weren't sure if it was the right thing, so it fell by the wayside." This version became a different track, "Pulk/Pull Revolving Doors", released on Amnesiac. The "True Love Waits" version was released on the 2021 reissue Kid A Mnesia; Rolling Stone described it as harsh and industrial.

2001—2016: Further performances 
During Radiohead's 2001 Amnesiac tour, Yorke performed "True Love Waits" solo several times on acoustic guitar. A performance was included on I Might Be Wrong: Live Recordings (2001). He performed it on several more occasions, including his solo performances at the 2009 Latitude Festival and the Cambridge Corn Exchange in 2010. 

From 2006, Radiohead began performing a slower version on Rhodes piano as an introduction to "Everything in Its Right Place". According to the Phoenix New Times, "This is a looser, lighter take ... without the clear chord changes and forceful desperation of the acoustic version, one that somehow emphasises the romantic quality of the lyrics rather than the loneliness."

2016: A Moon Shaped Pool 
In 2016, more than 20 years after it was written, Radiohead released "True Love Waits" as the last track on their ninth album, A Moon Shaped Pool, in a minimal piano arrangement. Radiohead performed this new arrangement on the Moon Shaped Pool tour, until their 2018 leg in South America, when Yorke again performed "True Love Waits" solo on acoustic guitar.

Composition 

The live version of "True Love Waits" released on I Might Be Wrong has Yorke performing the song alone on acoustic guitar. According to Pitchfork, it features unexpected chord changes and "vehement" guitar strumming. The Phoenix New Times likened the "earnest" and "simple" arrangement to Radiohead songs from the same era, such as "Fake Plastic Trees".

The studio version, released as the final track on A Moon Shaped Pool, was described as "mournful post-rock" and a "deconstructed ambient piano ballad". It features no guitar; instead, it uses a minimal, four-note piano figure, over which pianos are gradually overdubbed, creating polyrhythmic loops and textures. Bass enters in the second verse. Chart Attack described it as "slow and melancholy" in the tradition of Radiohead album closers such as "Videotape" from In Rainbows (2007).

According to Yorke, the first verse — "I'll drown my beliefs / To have your babies / I'll dress like your niece / And wash your swollen feet" — addresses the "difference between young and old", when people grow out of childish behaviour; the narrator is offering not to grow up to keep someone they love. The lines "And true love lives / On lollipops and crisps" were inspired by a story Yorke read about a child left alone by his parents for a week who survived by eating snacks. The song has a "pleading" refrain: "Don't leave, don't leave."

Reception
Reviewing I Might Be Wrong in 2001, Matt LeMay of Pitchfork wrote that "True Love Waits" is "absolutely gorgeous ... it can hold its own against any song on OK Computer". He felt that the song, along with the performance of "Like Spinning Plates", "justified the existence" of the album. Ted Kessler of NME praised Yorke's vocals as "clear and true". Nicholas Taylor of PopMatters described the performance s "a bittersweet victory of love" that "shows that behind all of Radiohead's modernist nightmares is a fragile, desperate desire to connect, fully and meaningfully, with just one person". Pitchfork wrote that the work-in-progress versions of "True Love Waits" released on MiniDiscs [Hacked] did not work, and offered insight into why Radiohead had struggled to finish it.

Rolling Stone and Arizona Republic named the studio version of "True Love Waits" the best song of May 2016. The Arizona Republic critic Ed Masley wrote that the new arrangement "heightens the sense of desperate yearning in Yorke's vocal as he begs his lover not to leave". Pitchfork named it the week's best new track and the ninth-best song of 2016. The critic Nathan Reese wrote: "'True Love Waits' is an elegiac coda to one of Radiohead's most inward-facing albums and a fitting treatment to a song that many already considered a classic. The wait was worth it." In 2017, Consequence of Sound named it the 12th-greatest Radiohead song, writing that it "shimmers with rainfall piano instead of mopey guitar". In 2019, Vulture named it the greatest Radiohead song and Pitchfork named it the 93rd-greatest song of the decade.

Though the Quietus critic Mike Diver was critical of A Moon Shaped Pool, he praised "True Love Waits" as Radiohead's most affecting song since their 2008 single "Nude". The NME writer Damian Jones said it was Radiohead's saddest song. Steve Jozef of the Phoenix New Times felt the new arrangement captured the best elements of Yorke's guitar and Rhodes piano performances, saving it from sentimentality, and was "the most straightforward, unpretentious, and emotionally raw composition on the album". The GQ critic Jake Woolf found the studio version disappointing, with "mushy piano that weighs the song down emotionally", and missed the "brightness" of the guitar version. Louder Sound said it was "weary and defeated, which may be deliberate, but less emotionally engaging".

Several critics felt the long wait made the studio version more powerful. The Vulture journalist Marc Hogan wrote that "the difference between the studio cut and its various predecessors floats over the proceedings like a ghost in the machine". The Pitchfork critic Jillian Mapes wrote of the "sense that an older, wiser man" was singing, and that the lyrics were more heartfelt "now that he seems resigned to haunting the afterlife". In Consequence of Sound, Nina Corcoran wrote that the long wait "allowed Radiohead to peel [the] words when riper than ever". The Phoenix New Times writer Jozef speculated that the studio version was influenced by Yorke's recent separation from his partner of almost 25 years, Rachel Owen. Whereas the early arrangement, likely written shortly after Yorke met Owen, has a "hopeful, proud character", the Moon Shaped Pool version sounds "resigned, isolated, lost". The Rolling Stone critic Andy Beta wrote that "the effect is like stumbling upon an old love letter years after a relationship has grown cold", and that whereas the "don't leave" refrain once suggested redemption, it now sounded like a goodbye.

Charts

Personnel 

 Colin Greenwood
 Jonny Greenwood
 Ed O'Brien
 Philip Selway
 Thom Yorke

 Nigel Godrich – production, engineering, mixing
 Sam Petts-Davies – engineering
 Maxime LeGuil – assistant engineering
 Bob Ludwig – mastering

References

Sources
Letts, Marianne Tatom. Radiohead and the Resistant Concept Album: How to Disappear Completely, 2010.

Footnotes

Radiohead songs
Songs written by Thom Yorke
Songs written by Jonny Greenwood
Songs written by Colin Greenwood
Songs written by Ed O'Brien
Songs written by Philip Selway
Rock ballads
2001 songs
2016 songs
2000s ballads